Sanctuary is the third and last album by English post-punk/new wave band The Passions, released on 18 September 1982 by Polydor Records.

The album was originally called "Cars Driven Fast" after the song on the album and artwork had been designed for it. However, the name was changed after the involvement of Cairo Management. The original title and artwork was used in some areas of Europe.

The album was reissued on CD in November 2019 by Rubellan Remasters and included 9 bonus tracks, the first 5 were A-side and B-side non-album singles and the other 4 were live recordings of other songs by The Passions, including their best-known song "I'm in Love with a German Film Star".

Track listing 

2019 CD bonus tracks:

Personnel 
The Passions

 Barbara Gogan – vocals, guitar
 Dave Agar – vocals, bass
 Kevin Armstrong – vocals, guitar
 Richard Williams – drums
 Jeff Smith – synthesiser

Technical

 Mick Glossop – producer, engineer
 Colin Leggett, Corinne Simcock – assistant engineers
 Recorded at The Garden, London
 Mixed at Maison Rouge Studios, London
 Chris Hopper – cover photography
 CD remastering, reissue producer and liner notes by Scott Davies

References 

1982 albums
Polydor Records albums
The Passions (British band) albums